Raising Mamay (International title: Raising Mama) is a 2022 Philippine television drama series broadcast by GMA Network. Directed by Don Michael Perez, it stars Ai-Ai delas Alas in the title role. It premiered on April 25, 2022 on the network's Afternoon Prime line up replacing Little Princess. The series concluded on July 29, 2022 with a total of 70 episodes. It was replaced by Return to Paradise in its timeslot.

Cast and characters

Lead cast
 Ai-Ai delas Alas as Leticia "Letty / Mamay" Reyes-Sandejas

Supporting cast
 Shayne Sava as Abigail "Abby" R. Sandejas
 Abdul Rahman as Paolo Ampil
 Valerie Concepcion as Sylvia Gonzales-Renancia 
 Gary Estrada as Randy Renancia
 Antonio Aquitania as Bong "Daday" Sandejas 
 Ina Feleo as Malou Reyes
 Joyce Ching  as Arma Villasis
 Tart Carlos as Wenda Liles
 Bryce Eusebio as Christopher Renancia
 Raquel Pareño as Berna Gonzales
 Orlando Sol as Monching Cruz
 Hannah Arguelles as Dwein Liles
 Ella Cristofani as Kelly Gomez
 Lei Angela Ollet as Pam Galvez

Production
Principal photography commenced on February 25, 2022.

Episodes
<onlyinclude>
<onlyinclude>

References

External links
 
 

2022 Philippine television series debuts
2022 Philippine television series endings
Filipino-language television shows
GMA Network drama series
Television shows set in the Philippines